Eicochrysops is a genus of butterflies in the family Lycaenidae. It is endemic to the Afrotropics.

Species
Eicochrysops antoto (Strand, 1911)
Eicochrysops damiri Turlin, 1995
Eicochrysops distractus (de Joannis & Verity, 1913)
Eicochrysops dudgeoni Riley, 1929
Eicochrysops eicotrochilus Bethune-Baker, 1924
Eicochrysops fontainei Stempffer, 1961
Eicochrysops hippocrates (Fabricius, 1793)
Eicochrysops masai (Bethune-Baker, 1905)
Eicochrysops meryamae Rougeot, 1983
Eicochrysops messapus (Godart, [1824])
Eicochrysops pauliani Stempffer, 1950
Eicochrysops pinheyi Heath, 1985
Eicochrysops rogersi Bethune-Baker, 1924
Eicochrysops sanguigutta (Mabille, 1879)
Eicochrysops sanyere Libert, 1993

References

External links
Eicochrysops at Markku Savela's Lepidoptera and Some Other Life Forms
 Royal Museum of Central Africa Images

 
Lycaenidae genera